This is a list of notable, openly lesbian, gay, bisexual, pansexual, and transgender sportspeople as well as those who identify as belonging to the broader queer community.

List

See also

 Coming out
 European Gay and Lesbian Sport Federation
 Federation of Gay Games
 Homosexuality in American football
 Homosexuality in association football
 Homosexuality in modern sports
 International Gay and Lesbian Football Association
 List of LGBT Olympians
 LGBT rights protests surrounding the 2014 Winter Olympics
 Principle 6 campaign
 Transgender people in sports
 World Outgames

References

External links

 
Lesbian, gay, bisexual and transgender
Sportspeople

de:Portal:Homo- und Bisexualität/Themenliste/Sport